The 1974–75 Football League season was Birmingham City Football Club's 72nd in the Football League and their 41st in the First Division. They finished in 17th position in the 22-team division, four points above the relegation positions. They entered the 1974–75 FA Cup at the third round proper and lost to Fulham in the last minute of the semi-final replay, lost to Crewe Alexandra in their opening match of the League Cup in the second round, and reached the semi-final of the Texaco Cup.

Twenty-eight players made at least one appearance in nationally organised first-team competition, and there were thirteen different goalscorers. Goalkeeper Dave Latchford and forward Bob Hatton played in 53 of the 56 first-team matches over the season, and the leading goalscorer was Hatton with 18 goals, of which 14 came in league competition.

Football League First Division

League table (part)

FA Cup

For the third time in seven seasons, Birmingham reached the semi-final of the FA Cup. This time, they drew with Fulham at Hillsborough so the tie went to a replay, played at Maine Road, Manchester. Goalless through normal time and all but a few seconds of extra timean announcement had already been made that the second replay would be at Highbury the following Mondaya long ball towards Birmingham's penalty area was struck by John Mitchell straight into goalkeeper Dave Latchford's face. The ball rebounded onto Mitchell's chest and back towards the goal to bobble over the line.

League Cup

Texaco Cup

Appearances and goals

Numbers in parentheses denote appearances as substitute.
Players with name struck through and marked  left the club during the playing season.
Players with names in italics and marked * were on loan from another club for the whole of their season with Birmingham.

See also
 Birmingham City F.C. seasons

Sources
 
 
 For match dates and results: 
 For lineups, appearances, goalscorers and attendances: Matthews (2010), Complete Record, pp. 384–85, 479.

References

Birmingham City F.C. seasons
Birmingham City